Otto I, Duke of Pomerania (1279 – 31 December 1344) was Duke of Pomerania-Stettin.

Youngest, and probably posthumous, son of Duke Barnim I and his third wife, Mechtild of Brandenburg-Salzwedel, Otto became titular co-ruler at his birth, along with his elder half-brother Barnim II and his much older half-brother Bogislaw IV.

Bogislaw was effectively sole ruler while Barnim and Otto were children, and it was not until 1294 that he shared power with his elder brothers. In 1295, with Barnim dead, the brothers divided Pomerania with Otto as ruler of Stettin while Bogislaw received Wolgast.

In 1296 Otto married Elizabeth of Holstein, daughter of Gerhard II, Count of Holstein-Plön. Their children included Barnim III, future Duke of Pomerania, and Mechtild, who married John III, Lord of Werle.

From 1320 his son Barnim (III) was co-ruler with Otto.

See also
List of Pomeranian duchies and dukes
History of Pomerania
Duchy of Pomerania
House of Pomerania

Dukes of Pomerania
1279 births
1344 deaths
House of Griffins